The Coosa Valley Fair is an annual fair in Floyd County, Georgia. The fair is organized by the Coosa Valley Fair Association, composed of members of the Exchange Club of Rome, Georgia.

History
The first Coosa Valley Fair was held in October 1949 at the farmer's market on Furnace Road in Rome, Georgia. A permanent fairground was established and first used for the 1953 fair.

There was no fair in 2020.

Attractions
Five main exhibits make up the fair: livestock, homemaking arts and crafts, horticulture and agriculture, arts and photography, and a community, educational and health agency exhibit.

A carnival midway and the Coosa Village vendor booths are popular attractions, as are fair events that include a cheerleading competition, a talent contest and the Miss Coosa Valley Fair pageant.

Beneficiaries
The prime beneficiary of the fair's proceeds is the Exchange Club Family Resource Center. A portion of the proceeds also support art programs in Floyd County schools.

References

External links

Rome Exchange Club

Annual fairs
Tourist attractions in Floyd County, Georgia
Recurring events established in 1949
Fairs in the United States
Festivals in Georgia (U.S. state)
1949 establishments in Georgia (U.S. state)